Orlando Parker (born March 7, 1972) is a former American football wide receiver. He played for the New York Jets in 1994.

References

1972 births
Living people
American football wide receivers
Troy Trojans football players
New York Jets players